A scanning helium ion microscope (SHIM, HeIM or HIM) is an imaging technology based on a scanning helium ion beam. Similar to other focused ion beam techniques, it allows to combine milling and cutting of samples with their observation at sub-nanometer resolution.

In terms of imaging, SHIM has several advantages over the traditional scanning electron microscope (SEM). Owing to the very high source brightness, and the short De Broglie wavelength of the helium ions, which is inversely proportional to their momentum, it is possible to obtain qualitative data not achievable with conventional microscopes which use photons or electrons as the emitting source. As the helium ion beam interacts with the sample, it does not suffer from a large excitation volume, and hence provides sharp images with a large depth of field on a wide range of materials. Compared to a SEM, the secondary electron yield is quite high, allowing for imaging with currents as low as 1 femtoamp. The detectors provide information-rich images which offer topographic, material, crystallographic, and electrical properties of the sample. In contrast to other ion beams, there is no discernible sample damage due to relatively light mass of the helium ion. The drawback is the cost.

SHIMs have been commercially available since 2007, and a surface resolution of 0.24 nanometers has been demonstrated.

References

External links 

 Carl Zeiss SMT – Nano Technology Systems Division: ORION He-Ion microscope
 Microscopy Today, Volume 14, Number 04, July 2006: An Introduction to the Helium Ion Microscope
 How New Helium Ion Microscope Measures Up – ScienceDaily

Microscopes
Helium